Hells Canyon is a valley in the U.S. state of South Dakota.

Hells Canyon received its name from its treacherous terrain (i.e. the valley was "hell to cross").

References

Landforms of Harding County, South Dakota
Valleys of South Dakota